Unión Deportiva Los Palacios was a Spanish football team based in Los Palacios y Villafranca, in the autonomous community of Andalusia. Founded in 1964, and dissolved in 2011, it held home games at Estadio Las Marismas, with a capacity of 4,500 seats. 

The team was dissolved on 23 June 2011 due to economic problems. In 2017, the club was reformed as Los Palacios CF and currently plays in the 7th tier.

Season to season

1 season in Segunda División B
19 seasons in Tercera División

Famous players
  Iván Zarandona
 Jesús Navas
 Marco Navas
  Antoñito

References

External links
Futbolme team profile 
FutbolAndaluz team profile 
LaPreferente team profile 

Defunct football clubs in Andalusia
Association football clubs established in 1964
Association football clubs disestablished in 2011
1964 establishments in Spain
2011 disestablishments in Spain
Province of Seville